The 3rd Iowa Infantry Regiment was an infantry regiment that served in the Union Army during the American Civil War.

Service
The 3rd Iowa Infantry was organized at Keokuk, Iowa and mustered into Federal forces on June 8, 1861.

The regiment was consolidated into a battalion of three companies in July, 1864 after those members of the regiment who did not reenlist mustered out and the survivors were transferred to 2nd Regiment Iowa Volunteer Infantry as Companies "A," "F," and "I" on November 4, 1864.

Total strength and casualties
Unit strength was 1099.  The regiment suffered 8 officers and 119 enlisted men who were killed in action or who died of their wounds and 122 enlisted men who died of disease, for a total of 249 fatalities. 207 were wounded.

Commanders
 Colonel Nelson G. Williams
 Lieutenant Colonel John Scott

See also
List of Iowa Civil War Units
Iowa in the American Civil War

Notes

References
The Civil War Archive

Units and formations of the Union Army from Iowa
1861 establishments in Iowa
Military units and formations established in 1861
Military units and formations disestablished in 1864
1864 disestablishments in Iowa